João Nuno Lobo Godinho (born 28 September 1984) is a Portuguese professional footballer who plays as a goalkeeper.

Club career
Born in Lisbon, Godinho competed in the lower leagues until the age of 31, representing S.L. Benfica B, U.D. Vilafranquense, S.C.U. Torreense, Clube Oriental de Lisboa, O Elvas CAD, Odivelas FC, A.D. Carregado and C.D. Mafra. In the 2014–15 season, he contributed nine appearances as the latter club promoted to the LigaPro for the first time ever.

Godinho made his debut as a professional on 30 September 2015, keeping a clean sheet in a 0–0 home draw against C.D. Santa Clara. The campaign would, however, end in immediate relegation after a 21st-place finish.

At the end of 2017–18, club and player managed to return to the second division after a two-year wait. In the process, Godinho did not concede a goal in 17 matches.

Career statistics

Club

Notes

References

External links

1984 births
Living people
Portuguese footballers
Footballers from Lisbon
Association football goalkeepers
Liga Portugal 2 players
Segunda Divisão players
S.L. Benfica B players  
U.D. Vilafranquense players
S.C.U. Torreense players
Clube Oriental de Lisboa players
O Elvas C.A.D. players
Odivelas F.C. players
C.D. Mafra players
Real S.C. players